Dennis Odhiambo (born 18 March 1985) is a Kenyan international footballer who plays for Kenya Commercial Bank, as a left back.

Career
Born in Siaya, Odhiambo has played club football for Thika United, University of Pretoria, Sofapaka and Kenya Commercial Bank.

He made his international debut for Kenya in 2011, representing them at the 2019 Africa Cup of Nations.

International goals
Scores and results list Kenya's goal tally first.

References

1985 births
Living people
Kenyan footballers
Kenya international footballers
Thika United F.C. players
University of Pretoria F.C. players
Sofapaka F.C. players
Kenya Commercial Bank S.C. players
Kenyan Premier League players
Association football fullbacks
Kenyan expatriate footballers
Kenyan expatriates in South Africa
Expatriate soccer players in South Africa
People from Siaya County
2019 Africa Cup of Nations players